Pickled beet eggs are hard boiled eggs that are cured in a brine of beets, beet juice, vinegar, sugar, cloves and other spices.  There are many regional variations to this classic dish; for instance, some recipes substitute cider vinegar for white vinegar, and brown sugar for white sugar. Pickled beet eggs are easy to make and have a rich pink color after only a day.

See also

References

Cuisine of the Midwestern United States
Pennsylvania Dutch cuisine
Egg dishes
English cuisine
Beet egg